Johanna Nichols (born 1945, Iowa City, Iowa) is an American linguist and professor emerita in the Department of Slavic Languages and Literatures at the University of California, Berkeley.

Career 
She earned her Ph.D. in Linguistics at the University of California, Berkeley, in 1973 with a dissertation titled, "The Balto-Slavic predicate instrumental: a problem in diachronic syntax."

Her research interests include the Slavic languages, the linguistic prehistory of northern Eurasia, language typology, ancient linguistic prehistory, and languages of the Caucasus, chiefly Chechen and Ingush. She has made fundamental contributions to these fields.

Honors 
A festschrift in her honor, Language Typology and Historical Contingency: In honor of Johanna Nichols, was published in 2013.

Nichols's best known work, Linguistic Diversity in Space and Time, won the Linguistic Society of America's Leonard Bloomfield Book Award for 1994.

In 2013 Nichols was inducted as a Fellow of the Linguistic Society of America.

Books
 Predicate Nominals: A Partial Surface Syntax of Russian. Berkeley: University of California Press, 1981. .
 Grammar Inside and Outside the Clause: Some Approaches to Theory from the Field. Edited by Johanna Nichols and Anthony C. Woodbury. Cambridge [Cambridgeshire]; New York: Cambridge University Press, 1985. .
 Evidentiality: The Linguistic Coding of Epistemology. Edited by Wallace Chafe and Johanna Nichols. Norwood, N.J.: Ablex Pub. Corp., 1986. 
 Linguistic Diversity in Space and Time. Chicago: University of Chicago Press, 1992. .
 Sound Symbolism. Edited by Leanne Hinton, Johanna Nichols, and John J. Ohala. Cambridge [England]; New York, NY: Cambridge University Press, 1994. .
 Chechen–English and English–Chechen Dictionary / Noxchiin–ingals, ingals–noxchiin deshnizhaina. London; New York: Routledge Curzon, 2004. . Johanna Nichols, Ronald L. Sprouse, and Arbi Vagapov.
 Ingush Grammar. Berkeley: University of California Press, 2010. .

References

External links

 Biography of Johanna Nichols
 The Chechen Language 
 The Ingush Language
 An overview of languages of the Caucasus
 Typology in the service of classification: Alternative approaches to language classification Stanford, July 17–19, 2007
 World Atlas of Language Structures

Linguists from the United States
Living people
University of California, Berkeley faculty
Linguists of Hokan languages
Linguists of Caucasian languages
Linguists of Northeast Caucasian languages
Linguists of Ingush
Linguists of Chechen
Paleolinguists
Women linguists
1945 births
Fellows of the Linguistic Society of America
University of California, Berkeley alumni